Mabuyonyssus is a genus of mites in the family Laelapidae.

Species
 Mabuyonyssus freedmani Till, 1957

References

Laelapidae